Badaga Cinema is the term used to refer to the Badaga language film industry based in Udagamandalam in Tamil Nadu, India. Since the production of the first Badaga film in the mid-1970s, a total of four Badaga films have been made.

Films 

 Kaalaa Thaappita Payilu (1979)
 Hosa Mungaru (2006)
 Gavava Thedi (2009)
 Cinnatha Boomi (2010)
 Olluna Atta(2019)

'Hosa Mungaru''

It is the first colour film in Baduga language. The film was directed by Vetri, and edited by King David. It was released in 2006.

References 

 

Culture of Ooty
Cinema by language of India
Film genres